Ras-related protein Rab-9A is a protein that in humans is encoded by the RAB9A gene.

Interactions 

RAB9A has been shown to interact with RABEPK, TIP47 and the Biogenesis of lysosome-related organelles complex 3.

References

Further reading